Frifot is a Swedish folk music trio which was formed in 1987. Its members are Lena Willemark, Per Gudmundson and Ale Möller. When it was first formed, the group called themselves Möller, Willemark & Gudmundson; the name Frifot, literally footloose, comes from the lyrics of one of the songs they play. Over the years, the trio's members have also had solo careers and performed with other groups, but Frifot has never ceased to exist as a group. Their fifth full-length CD was released in October 2007.

The trio has toured in a number of countries including Poland, Great Britain, Germany, France, Italy, Japan, the United States and India, as well as the Nordic countries. Their third tour of the United States, in 2000, included a performance on the radio show A Prairie Home Companion. Their CD Sluring received the Grammis award for  the best folk music album of 2003.

Members 
 Lena Willemark, vocals, violin, wooden flute
 Per Gudmundson, violin, Swedish bagpipes, vocals
 Ale Möller, mandola, droneflute, wooden flute, shawm, harmonic, low whistle, willow flute, hammered dulcimer, folkharp, vocals

Discography 
 Frifot, 1991 (as Möller, Willemark & Gudmundson)
 Järven, 1996
 Frifot, 1999
 Summer Song, 1999 (compilation album)
 Sluring, 2003
 Flyt, 2007

References 

Swedish folk music groups